Shener Hyusein Remzi (born 18 August 1976) is a Bulgarian footballer of Turkish descent, who currently plays for FC Kubrat as a midfielder.

References

Bulgarian footballers
1976 births
Living people
Botev Plovdiv players
FC Dunav Ruse players
PFC Chernomorets Burgas players
FC Chernomorets Burgas players
PFC Ludogorets Razgrad players
People from Razgrad
Bulgarian people of Turkish descent
First Professional Football League (Bulgaria) players
Association football midfielders